Parmenides of Elea (fl. late sixth or early fifth century BC) was a pre-Socratic Greek philosopher from Elea in Magna Graecia.

Parmenides was born in the Greek colony of Elea, from a wealthy and illustrious family. His dates are uncertain; according to doxographer Diogenes Laërtius, he flourished just before 500 BC, which would put his year of birth near 540 BC, but in the dialogue Parmenides Plato has him visiting Athens at the age of 65, when Socrates was a young man, c. 450 BC, which, if true, suggests a year of birth of c. 515 BC. He is thought to have been in his prime (or "floruit") around 475 BC.

The single known work by Parmenides is a poem whose original title is unknown but which is often referred to as On Nature. Only fragments of it survive. In his poem, Parmenides prescribes two views of reality. The first, the Way of "Aletheia" or truth, describes how all reality is one, change is impossible, and existence is timeless and uniform. The second view, the way of "Doxa", or opinion, describes the world of appearances, in which one's sensory faculties lead to conceptions which are false and deceitful.

Parmenides has been considered the founder of ontology and has, through his influence on Plato, influenced the whole history of Western philosophy.  He is also considered to be the founder of the Eleatic school of philosophy, which also included Zeno of Elea and Melissus of Samos. Zeno's paradoxes of motion were developed to defend Parmenides' views. In contemporary philosophy, Parmenides' work has remained relevant in debates about the philosophy of time.

Biography
Parmenides was born in Elea (called Velia in Roman times), a city located in Magna Graecia. Diogenes Laertius says that his father was Pires, and that he belonged to a rich and noble family. Laertius also transmits two divergent sources in as regards the teacher of the philosopher. One, dependent on Sotion, indicates that he was first a student of Xenophanes, but did not follow him, and later became associated with a Pythagorean, Aminias, whom he preferred as his teacher. Another tradition, dependent on Theophrastus, indicates that he was a disciple of Anaximander.

Chronology
Everything related to the chronology of Parmenides – the date of his birth, of his death, as well as the time of his philosophical activity – is uncertain.

Date of birth 
All conjectures about Parmenides' date of birth are based on two ancient sources. One comes from Apollodorus and is transmitted to us by Diogenes Laertius: this source marks the Olympiad 69th (between 504 BC and 500 BC) as the moment of maturity, placing his birth 40 years earlier (544 BC – 540 BC). The other is Plato, in his dialogue Parmenides. There Plato composes a situation in which Parmenides, 65, and Zeno, 40, travel to Athens to attend the Panathenaic Games . On that occasion they meet Socrates, who was still very young according to the Platonic text.

The inaccuracy of the dating from Apollodorus is well known, who chooses the date of a historical event to make it coincide with the maturity —the floruit— of a philosopher, a maturity that they invariably reached at forty years of age. He also tries to always match the maturity of a philosopher with the birth of his alleged disciple. In this case Apollodorus, according to Burnet, based his date of the foundation of Elea (540 BC) to chronologically locate the maturity of Xenophanes and thus the birth of his supposed disciple, Parmenides. Knowing this, Burnet and later classicists like Cornford, Raven, Guthrie, and Schofield preferred to base the calculations on the Platonic dialogue. According to the latter, the fact that Plato adds so much detail regarding ages in his text is a sign that he writes with chronological precision. Plato says that Socrates was very young, and this is interpreted to mean that he was less than twenty years old. We know the year of Socrates' death, 399 BC., And his age: he was about seventy years old. That is why we also know the date of his birth: 469 BC The Panathenaic games were held every four years, and of those held during Socrates' youth (454, 450, 446), the most likely is that of 450 BC, when Socrates was 19 years old. And, if at this meeting Parmenides was about 65 years old, his birth occurred around 515 BC.

However, neither Raven nor Schofield, who follows the former, finds a dating based on a late Platonic dialogue entirely satisfactory. Other scholars directly prefer not to use the Platonic testimony and propose other dates. According to a scholar of the Platonic dialogues, R. Hirzel, Conrado Eggers Lan indicates that the historical has no value for Plato. The fact that the meeting between Socrates and Parmenides is also mentioned in the dialogues Theaetetus (183e) and Sophist (217c) only indicates that it is referring to the same fictional event, and this is possible because both the Theaetetus and the Sophist are considered after the Parmenides. In Soph. 217c the dialectic procedure of Socrates is attributed to Parmenides, which would confirm that this is nothing more than a reference to the fictitious dramatic situation of the dialogue. Eggers Lan also proposes a correction of the traditional date of the foundation of Elea. Based on Herodotus I, 163–167, which indicates that the Phocians, after defeating the Carthaginians in naval battle, founded Elea, and adding the reference to Thucydides I, 13, where it is indicated that such a battle occurred in the time of Cambyses II, the foundation of Elea can be placed between 530 BC and 522 BC So Parmenides could not have been born before 530 BC or after 520 BC, given that it predates Empedocles. This last dating procedure is not infallible either, because it has been questioned that the fact that links the passages of Herodotus and Thucydides is the same. Nestor Luis Cordero also rejects the chronology based on the Platonic text, and the historical reality of the encounter, in favor of the traditional date of Apollodorus. He follows the traditional datum of the founding of Elea in 545 BC, pointing to it not only as terminus post quem, but as a possible date of Parmenides' birth. From which he concludes that his parents were part of the founding contingent of the city, and that he was a contemporary of Heraclitus. The evidence also suggests that Parmenides could not have written much after the death of Heraclitus.

Timeline relative to other Presocratics 
Beyond the speculations and inaccuracies about his date of birth, some specialists have turned their attention to certain passages of his work to specify the relationship of Parmenides with other thinkers. It was thought to find in his poem certain controversial allusions to the doctrine of Anaximenes and the Pythagoreans (fragment B 8, verse 24, and frag. B 4), and also against Heraclitus (frag .B 6, vv.8–9), while Empedocles and Anaxagoras frequently refer to Parmenides.

The reference to Heraclitus has been debated. Bernays's thesis that Parmenides attacks Heraclitus, to which Diels, Kranz, Gomperz, Burnet and others adhered, was discussed by Reinhardt, whom Jaeger followed.

Guthrie finds it surprising that Heraclitus would not have censured Parmenides if he had known him, as he did with Xenophanes and Pythagoras. His conclusion, however, does not arise from this consideration, but points out that, due to the importance of his thought, Parmenides splits the history of pre-Socratic philosophy in two, therefore his position with respect to other thinkers it is easy to determine. And, from this point of view, the philosophy of Heraclitus seems to him pre-Parmenidean, while those of Empedocles, Anaxagoras and Democritus are post-Parmenidean.

Anecdotes 
Plutarch, Strabo and Diogenes —following the testimony of Speusippus— agree that Parmenides participated in the government of his city, organizing it and giving it a code of admirable laws.

Archaeological discovery
In 1969, the plinth of a statue dated to the 1st century AD was excavated in Velia. On the plinth were four words: ΠΑ[Ρ]ΜΕΝΕΙΔΗΣ ΠΥΡΗΤΟΣ ΟΥΛΙΑΔΗΣ ΦΥΣΙΚΟΣ. The first two clearly say «Parmenides, son of Pires». The fourth word φυσικός (fysikós, "physicist") was commonly used to designate philosophers who devoted themselves to the observation of nature. On the other hand, there is no agreement on the meaning of the third (οὐλιάδης, ouliadēs): it can simply mean "a native of Elea" (the name "Velia" is in Greek Οὐέλια), or "belonging to the Οὐλιος" (Ulios), that is, to a medical school (whose patron was Apollo Ulius). If this last hypothesis were true, then Parmenides would be, in addition to being a legislator, a doctor. The hypothesis is reinforced by the ideas contained in fragment 18 of his poem, which contains anatomical and physiological observations. However, other specialists believe that the only certainty we can extract from the discovery is that of the social importance of Parmenides in the life of his city, already indicated by the testimonies that indicate his activity as a legislator.

Visit to Athens 
Plato, in his dialogue Parmenides, relates that, accompanied by his disciple Zeno of Elea, Parmenides visited Athens when he was approximately 65 years old and that, on that occasion, Socrates, then a young man, conversed with him. Athenaeus of Naucratis had noted that, although the ages make a dialogue between Parmenides and Socrates hardly possible, the fact that Parmenides has sustained arguments similar to those sustained in the Platonic dialogue is something that seems impossible. Most modern classicists consider the visit to Athens and the meeting and conversation with Socrates to be fictitious. Allusions to this visit in other Platonic works are only references to the same fictitious dialogue and not to a historical fact.

On Nature 
Parmenides' sole work, which has only survived in fragments, is a poem in dactylic hexameter, later titled On Nature. Approximately 160 verses remain today from an original total that was probably near 800. The poem was originally divided into three parts: An introductory proem that contains an allegorical narrative which explains the purpose of the work, a former section known as "The Way of Truth" (aletheia, ἀλήθεια), and a latter section known as "The Way of Appearance/Opinion" (doxa, δόξα). Despite the poem's fragmentary nature, the general plan of both the proem and the first part, "The Way of Truth" have been ascertained by modern scholars, thanks to large excerpts made by Sextus Empiricus and Simplicius of Cilicia. Unfortunately, the second part, "The Way of Opinion," which is supposed to have been much longer than the first, only survives in small fragments and prose paraphrases.

Introduction 
The introductory proem describes the narrator's journey to receive a revelation from an unnamed goddess on the nature of reality. The remainder of the work is then presented as the spoken revelation of the goddess without any accompanying narrative.

The narrative of the poet's journey includes a variety of allegorical symbols, such as a speeding chariot with glowing axles, horses, the House of Night, Gates of the paths of Night and Day, and maidens who are "the daughters of the Sun" who escort the poet from the ordinary daytime world to a strange destination, outside our human paths. The allegorical themes in the poem have attracted a variety of different interpretations, including comparisons to Homer and Hesiod, and attempts to relate the journey towards either enlightenment or darkness, but there is little scholarly consensus about any interpretation, and the surviving evidence from the poem itself, as well as any other literary use of allegory from the same time period, may be too sparse to ever determine any of the intended symbolism with certainty.

The Way of Truth 
In the Way of Truth, an estimated 90% of which has survived, Parmenides distinguishes between the unity of nature and its variety, insisting in the Way of Truth upon the reality of its unity, which is therefore the object of knowledge, and upon the unreality of its variety, which is therefore the object, not of knowledge, but of opinion. This contrasts with the argument in the section called "the way of opinion,"  which discusses that which is illusory.

The Way of Opinion 
In the significantly longer, but far worse preserved latter section of the poem, Way of Opinion, Parmenides propounds a theory of the world of seeming and its development, pointing out, however, that, in accordance with the principles already laid down, these cosmological speculations do not pretend to anything more than mere appearance. The structure of the cosmos is a fundamental binary principle that governs the manifestations of all the particulars: "the aether fire of flame" (B 8.56), which is gentle, mild, soft, thin and clear, and self-identical, and the other is "ignorant night", body thick and heavy. Cosmology originally comprised the greater part of his poem, explaining the world's origins and operations. Some idea of the sphericity of the Earth also seems to have been known to Parmenides.

Legacy 
As the first of the Eleatics, Parmenides is generally credited with being the philosopher who first defined ontology as a separate discipline distinct from theology. His most important pupil was Zeno, who appears alongside him in Plato's Parmenides where they debate dialectic with Socrates. The pluralist theories of Empedocles and Anaxagoras and the atomist Leucippus, and Democritus have also been seen as a potential response to Parmenides' arguments and conclusions. Parmenides is also mentioned in Plato's Sophist and Theaetetus. Later Hellenistic doxographers also considered Parmenides to have been a pupil of Xenophanes. Eusebius, quoting Aristocles of Messene, says that Parmenides was part of a line of skeptical philosophy that culminated in Pyrrhonism for he, by the root, rejects the validity of perception through the senses whilst, at any rate, it is first through our five forms of senses that we become aware of things and then by faculty of reasoning. Parmenides' proto-monism of the One also influenced Plotinus and Neoplatonism.

Notes

Fragments

Citations

Bibliography

Ancient testimony
In the Diels–Kranz numbering for testimony and fragments of Pre-Socratic philosophy, Parmenides is catalogued as number 28. The most recent edition of this catalogue is:

Life and doctrines 

A1. 
A2. 
A3. 
A4. 
A5. 
A6. 
A7. 
A8. 
A9. 
A10. 
A11. 
A12.

Fragments

Modern scholarship

Further reading 

Bakalis, Nikolaos (2005), Handbook of Greek Philosophy: From Thales to the Stoics Analysis and Fragments, Trafford Publishing, 

Cordero, Nestor-Luis (2004), By Being, It Is: The Thesis of Parmenides. Parmenides Publishing, 
Cordero, Néstor-Luis (ed.), Parmenides, Venerable and Awesome (Plato, Theaetetus 183e) Las Vegas: Parmenides Publishing 2011. Proceedings of the International Symposium (Buenos Aires, 2007), 
Coxon,but A. H. (2009), The Fragments of Parmenides: A Critical Text With Introduction and Translation, the Ancient Testimonia and a Commentary. Las Vegas, Parmenides Publishing (new edition of Coxon 1986), 
Curd, Patricia (2011), A Presocratics Reader: Selected Fragments and Testimonia, Hackett Publishing,  (Second edition Indianapolis/Cambridge 2011)
Hermann, Arnold (2005), To Think Like God: Pythagoras and Parmenides-The Origins of Philosophy, Fully Annotated Edition, Parmenides Publishing, 
Hermann, Arnold (2010), Plato's Parmenides: Text, Translation & Introductory Essay, Parmenides Publishing, 
Mourelatos, Alexander P. D. (2008). The Route of Parmenides: A Study of Word, Image, and Argument in the Fragments. Las Vegas: Parmenides Publishing.  (First edition Yale University Press 1970)
Palmer, John. (2009). Parmenides and Presocratic Philosophy. Oxford: Oxford University Press.
Extensive bibliography (up to 2004) by Nestor-Luis Cordero; and annotated bibliography by Raul Corazzon

External links 

 
"Lecture Notes: Parmenides", S. Marc Cohen, University of Washington
Parmenides and the Question of Being in Greek Thought with a selection of critical judgments
Parmenides of Elea: Critical Editions and Translations –  annotated list of the critical editions and of the English, German, French, Italian and Spanish translations
Fragments of Parmenides – parallel Greek with links to Perseus, French, and English (Burnet) includes Parmenides article from Encyclopædia Britannica Eleventh Edition

5th-century BC Greek people
5th-century BC philosophers
5th-century BC poets
510s BC births
450s BC deaths
Eleatic philosophers
Ancient Greek epistemologists
Lucanian Greeks
Ancient Greek metaphysicians
Ancient Greek physicists
Ontologists
Philosophers of Magna Graecia
Ancient Greek philosophers of mind
People from the Province of Salerno